This is a list of music releases from and relating to the BBC television series Doctor Who. It is split into two sections: One for soundtracks of music from the show and its spinoffs, and one for music relating to the series, mainly novelty or tribute releases.

Soundtrack music

Doctor Who 
There have been several LP and CD releases of music and sound effects over the years from the BBC television series Doctor Who by the BBC Radiophonic Workshop, freelance composers, and stock music.

Home video isolated scores
Various stories have been released on DVD/Blu-ray by BBC Video/2 Entertain (unless otherwise indicated) with isolated scores as an option during viewing.

Spinoffs

Feature films

Television spinoffs

Direct to video spinoffs

{{Episode table |background=#8BC380 |title=37 |director=26 |directorT=Composer |aux2=13 |aux3=9 |airdate=15 |aux2T=Label |aux3T=Format |released=y |episodes=

{{Episode list
| RTitle          = Dæmos Rising: The Music
| DirectedBy      = Alistair Lock
| Aux2            = Reeltime
| Aux3            = CD
| OriginalAirDate = 
| ShortSummary    = Music from the direct-to-DVD spinoff| LineColor       = 8BC380
}}
}}

Big Finish
Music from the Big Finish range of audios.

Other spinoffs

Related music releases
Over the years, there have been music releases that did not feature in the series, but are related to Doctor Who'', ranging from novelty spoofs to tributes to the series.

See also

 Doctor Who theme music
 List of music featured on Doctor Who
 List of Doctor Who composers

Notes and references
Notes

References
 
 
 

Doctor Who
Music based on Doctor Who
Music releases
Music releases